Dissociative recombination is a chemical process where a positive polyatomic ion recombines with an electron, and as a result, the neutral molecule dissociates. This reaction is important for extraterrestrial and atmospheric chemistry. On Earth, dissociative recombination rarely occurs naturally, as free electrons react with any molecule (even neutral molecules) they encounter. Even in the best laboratory conditions, dissociative recombination is hard to observe, but is an important reaction in systems that have large populations of ionized molecules, for instance in atmospheric-pressure plasmas.

In astrophysics, dissociative recombination is one of the main mechanisms via which molecules are broken down, and other molecules are formed. The existence of dissociative recombination is possible due to the vacuum of the interstellar medium. A typical example of dissociative recombination in astrophysics is:

CH3+ + e- -> CH2 + H

See also
Ionization

References

Astrophysics